Samuel José da Silva Vieira (born 14 October 1974) is a Brazilian footballer who plays for Bahia de Feira. Samuel spent his early career in Campeonato Brasileiro Série A, then moved to Perugia of Italian first division before spent rest of his career in Brazilian lower divisions.

Biography

Bahia
Born in Coração de Maria, Bahia state, Samuel made his Campeonato Brasileiro Série A debut on 28 August 1994, for Esporte Clube Bahia. Since then he played 40 times in Campeonato Brasileiro Série A. He followed the team relegated to 1998 Campeonato Brasileiro Série B.

Caxias do Sul
He played the first 3 games of 2001 Campeonato Brasileiro Série B.

Perugia
In August 2001 he left for Italian Serie A club Perugia. He made his league debut on 28 October 2001 (round 9), winning Piacenza 1–0. He replaced Sean Sogliano in the first half. Samuel made his first start in the next round. He also played for the team in 2001–02 Coppa Italia.

Return to Brazil
In February 2003 he returned to Brazil for Criciúma. In March he left for Santa Cruz. He then left for Caxias do Sul. In 2004, he was the starting defender of Caxias do Sul, only missed round 8 to 10 and round 20, which 2 of them were automatic suspension for third and sixth caution (yellow card) of the season. Samuel renewed his contract with Caxias do Sul on 16 December 2004 for another year. He played the first 8 matches of 2005 Campeonato Brasileiro Série B as starting defender and again in round 11 and 12. On 25 July 2005 he left for União São João until the end of 2005 Campeonato Brasileiro Série C, which he played the first 3 rounds of the league.

On 7 December 2005 he was signed by Glória until the end of 2006 Campeonato Gaúcho. On 23 August 2006 he left for CFZ do Rio, for a playoffs round to qualify for 2007 Campeonato Carioca. CFZ exited in the first round. On 21 September 2006 he was signed by CRB, played 6 out of last 9 games of 2006 Campeonato Brasileiro Série B.

Late career
In January 2007 he left for Tupi until the end of 2007 Campeonato Mineiro, which he was the starting defender in the first 6 games. He then played for São José de Porto Alegre in 2008 and 2009 Campeonato Gaúcho, however he did not contracted to play in 2008 and 2009 Copa FGF of the second half of year. In 2010, he left for Atlético de Alagoinhas until the end of 2010 Campeonato Baiano. On 13 January 2011, he was signed by Bahia de Feira.

Career statistics

Note: State Leagues are marked as League Cup.

References

External links
 
 Calciatori.com 
 Futpedia 
 Yahoo!Brasil 
 CBF  

Brazilian footballers
Serie A players
Esporte Clube Bahia players
Sociedade Esportiva e Recreativa Caxias do Sul players
A.C. Perugia Calcio players
Criciúma Esporte Clube players
Santa Cruz Futebol Clube players
União São João Esporte Clube players
Clube de Regatas Brasil players
Tupi Football Club players
Esporte Clube São José players
Alagoinhas Atlético Clube players
Brazilian expatriate footballers
Expatriate footballers in Italy
Brazilian expatriate sportspeople in Italy
Association football central defenders
Sportspeople from Bahia
1974 births
Living people